

See also 
 Massachusetts's 2nd congressional district special election, 1808
 United States House of Representatives elections, 1808 and 1809
 List of United States representatives from Massachusetts

Notes

References 

1808
Massachusetts
United States House of Representatives